Künefe peyniri (Turkish Künefe peyniri) a Turkish cheese made of  cow milk, goat milk, or a combination, and used to prepare künefe.

See also

 Turkish cuisine

References

Goat's-milk cheeses
Turkish cheeses